Diploglossa is a clade of neoanguimorphs represented by the families Xenosauridae, Diploglossidae, Anniellidae and Anguidae, the latter three placed in the superfamily Anguioidea. In the past the Chinese crocodile lizard was classified as a xenosaurid; current molecular work has shown evidence the species related to varanoids in the clade Paleoanguimorpha.

Below is the phylogeny of the neoanguimorph lineages after Pyron et al. (2013):

References

Anguimorpha
Taxa named by Edward Drinker Cope